Castleberry may refer to:

Castleberry, Alabama, a town in Conecuh County, Alabama, United States
Castleberry Hill, a neighborhood in central Atlanta, located southwest of the Central Business District
Castleberry Independent School District, a public school district based in River Oaks, Texas (USA)
Castleberry, Florence Jean, better known "Flo", is a fictional character in the movie Alice Doesn't Live Here Anymore
Castleberry, Bruce, former Guitarist of Vallejo (band)
Castleberry's Food Company, an Augusta, GA-based canned food company
Clint Castleberry, football player and Georgia Tech's only retired football jersey